Lee Yeo-jin (born 3 November 1987) is a South Korean announcer and SBS 8 News's weather caster. She was also a former student at Seoul Women's University, Seoul, South Korea.

She is currently married to fellow SBS anchor and reporter, Kim Hyun-woo since 15 December 2019. They welcomed their first child together, a son, on 22 August 2020.

References

1987 births
Living people
South Korean television presenters
South Korean women television presenters
South Korean announcers
People from Seoul